Libian refers to the natural, gradual, and systematic simplification of Chinese characters over time during the 2nd Century BC, as Chinese writing transitioned from seal script character forms to clerical script characters during the early Han dynasty period, through the process of making omissions, additions, or transmutations of the graphical form of a character to make it easier to write. Libian was one of two conversion processes towards the new clerical script character forms, with the other being liding, which involved the regularisation and linearisation of character shapes.

Process
The earlier seal script characters were complicated and inconvenient to write; as a result, lower-level officials and clerics gradually simplified the strokes, and transitioned from writing with bowed ink brushes to using straight ink brushes, which both improved ease of writing.

The complexity of characters can be reduced in one of four ways:
Modulation: The replacement of character components with an unrelated component.
Mutation: Some characters undergo modulation so suddenly that no clue hinting at the original form can be found in the new form.
Omission: The complete omission of a character component.
Reduction: Simplifies character components to a form with fewer strokes. For example, the ancient form of / (xiān, Old Chinese: /*sen/; "celestial being") had the complex phonetic component  (Old Chinese: /*sʰen/) simplified into  (Old Chinese: /*sreːn/), creating the clerical form .

Examples

References

Chinese characters